"Obsession" is a single which appeared on DJ Tiësto's first album, In My Memory in 2001, the track features the production of Tom Holkenborg also known as Junkie XL. The song was recorded at the Computer Hell Cabin, Amsterdam.

Formats and track listings

CD, Maxi Singles
United Kingdom Maxi Single
 "Obsession" (Original Mix) - 6:58
 "Obsession" (Filterheadz Remix) - 6:40
 "Obsession" (Frank Biazzi Remix) - 6:02

United Kingdom, Germany Maxi Single
 "Obsession" (Original Full Length Mix) - 6:59
 "Obsession" (Frank Biazzi Remix) - 6:06
 "Obsession" (Filterheadz Remix) - 8:23
 "Obsession" (Robin Hill Code Blue Remix) - 7:36
 "Obsession" (Nubreed Remix) - 9:08

Sweden Maxi Single
 "Obsession" (Radio Edit Version 1)
 "Obsession" (Radio Edit Version 2)
 "Obsession" (Frank Biazzi Remix) - 6:02
 "Obsession" (Filterheadz Remix) - 6:40
 "Obsession" (Original Version) - 6:59
 "Obsession" (Nubreed Remix) - 9:08

12" Vinyl
Magik Muzik, Electropolis 12" Vinyl
 "Obsession" (Frank Biazzi Remix) - 7:00
 "Obsession" (Filterheadz Remix) - 8:18

Nebula 12" Vinyl
 "Obsession" (Filterheadz Remix) - 8:18
 "Obsession" (Nubreed Remix) - 9:08

Nebula 12" Vinyl
 "Obsession" (Original Full Length Mix) - 6:59
 "Obsession" (Frank Biazzi Remix) - 6:06

Charts

Official versions
 Radio Edit Version 1
 Radio Edit Version 2
 Frank Biazzi Remix (7:00)
 Filterheadz Remix (8:18)
 Original Version (6:59)
 Robin Hill Code Blue Remix (7:36)
 Nubreed Remix (9:08)

Release history

References

Tiësto songs
2002 singles
Songs written by Tiësto